Cyril Svoboda (born 25 November 1956) is a Czech politician, who was leader of the Christian and Democratic Union – Czechoslovak People's Party (KDU–ČSL) in 2001–2003 and 2009–2010, and a member of the Chamber of Deputies in 1998–2010. During his political career he held several ministerial positions, including Deputy Prime Minister (July 2002 – August 2004) and Minister of Foreign Affairs (July 2002–September 2006). He founded the Diplomatic Academy in Prague in 2011 and is currently lecturing at several universities in Prague.

Early political career
After graduating from the Faculty of Law of Charles University in Prague in 1980, Svoboda worked as an in-house lawyer for the state gas supplier Transgas, and then as a notary public in Prague. He started his political career in 1990, shortly after the Velvet Revolution, as an adviser to the Deputy Prime Minister of the Czech and Slovak Federal Government on human rights and on relations between the Czech government and the churches.

Svoboda worked as an assistant at the Faculty of Law of Charles University while studying at the Pan American Institute for International Studies (Notre Dame University) in 1991. He became an adviser to the Prime Minister of the Czech and Slovak Federal Government in the same year, and then became Deputy Chairman of the Government Legislative Council in 1992. He joined KDU-ČSL in 1995. In 1996 he started working at the Ministry of Foreign Affairs as the Deputy Minister responsible for Czech accession to the EU, a process that he concluded as Minister of Foreign Affairs in 2004.

Ministerial positions
Entering top level politics as the Czech Minister of the Interior (2 January 1998 – 23 July 1998) in the Government led by Josef Tošovský, Svodoba was also elected to the Chamber of Deputies on 20 June 1998. He spent the next four years as chairman of the Petitions Committee of the Chamber of Deputies.

Svoboda became leader of KDU-ČSL in 2001. After the parliamentary election in June 2002 his party formed a coalition with the Social Democrats and he became the Deputy Prime Minister and Minister of Foreign Affairs. He lost the leadership of his party to Miroslav Kalousek in 2003, and consequently the position of the Deputy Prime Minister a year later when Prime Minister Vladimír Špidla resigned. However, Svoboda remained as Minister of Foreign Affairs through all three governments in this four-year term, during which time he successfully finished the accession process of the Czech Republic to the European Union in April 2004.

When KDU-ČSL formed a coalition with the Civic Democratic Party (ODS) and the Green Party in 2007 Svodoba became a minister without portfolio and Chairman of the Government Legislative Council. During the Government "rejuvenation" in January 2009 he became Minister for Regional Development, but a few months later the Chamber of Deputies passed a motion of no confidence; the Government fell and was replaced by a caretaker government led by Jan Fischer.

Retirement from politics
With KDU-ČSL splitting in 2009 and the breakaway faction forming TOP 09, Svoboda became leader of KDU-ČSL again, and led the party into the parliamentary elections in 2010. The weakened party did not gain any seats and he immediately resigned.

A year later Svoboda founded the Diplomatic Academy in Prague, focused on improving both public and private administration. He also returned to teaching and is currently teaching at the Anglo-American University in Prague and at the CEVRO Institute.

Family
Cyril Svoboda is married to Věnceslava Svobodová, a neurologist. They have four sons: Václav, Norbert and twins Radim and Vojtěch. Among his five other siblings, he has a twin brother Josef, also politically active within KDU-ČSL.

Political roles
 January 1998 – July 1998: Minister of Interior 
 May 2001 – November 2003: Chairman of KDU-ČSL
 1998 – 2002: Chairman of the Petitions Committee of the Chamber of Deputies 
 July 2002 – September 2006 : Minister of Foreign Affairs 
 July 2002 – August 2004:  Deputy Prime Minister
 January 2007 – January 2009: Minister without Portfolio and Chairman of the Government's Legislative Council
 January 2009 – May 2009 : Minister for Regional Development
 May 2009 – May 2010 : Chairman of KDU-ČSL

Decorations
 2006: Decoration of Honour for Services to the Republic of Austria (Großes Goldenes Ehrenzeichen am Bande)
 2008: Order of Merit of the Federal Republic of Germany (Grand Merit Cross with Star and Sash)
 2012: Officer of the French Legion of Honour

References

External links

 
 Diplomatic Academy in Prague
 Cyril Svoboda - Politico

1956 births
Living people
Charles University alumni
Politicians from Prague
Interior ministers of the Czech Republic
Regional Development ministers of the Czech Republic
Foreign Ministers of the Czech Republic
KDU-ČSL MPs
Leaders of KDU-ČSL
KDU-ČSL Government ministers
Grand Crosses with Star and Sash of the Order of Merit of the Federal Republic of Germany
Members of the Chamber of Deputies of the Czech Republic (1998–2002)
Members of the Chamber of Deputies of the Czech Republic (2002–2006)
Members of the Chamber of Deputies of the Czech Republic (2006–2010)